Agaraea nigrostriata is a moth of the family Erebidae first described by Walter Rothschild in 1909. It is found in Argentina and Bolivia.

References

Moths described in 1909
Phaegopterina
Moths of South America